Pedro de Sintra, also known as Pêro de Sintra, Pedro da Cintra or Pedro da Sintra, was a Portuguese explorer. He was among the first Europeans to explore the West African coast. Around 1462 his expedition reached what is now Sierra Leone and named it. Although according to professor C. Magbaily Fyle this could have possibly been a misinterpretation of historians; there has been evidence of Serra Lyoa being mentioned prior to 1462, the year when de Sintra's expedition reached the coast of Sierra Leone. This would suggest that the person who named Sierra Leone is still unknown. However, if de Sintra did name the area, it is unclear whether he named it after the landforms or climate in the area. According to some the coastal regions resembled lion's teeth while others suggest the thunderstorms sounded like the roar of a lion. Sixteenth century English sailors called the area Sierra Leoa which later evolved to Sierra Leone in the 17th century. The British, prior to the area being colonised, officially adopted the name Sierra Leone in 1787.

De Sintra continued his journey with his expedition from Sierra Leone to contemporary Nigeria, where the Kingdom of Benin thrived. He described the streets of Benin as wide and clean; unlike anything he had encounted in Europe. He also described the people as well clad.

References

15th-century explorers of Africa
15th-century Portuguese people
Maritime history of Portugal
People from Lagos, Portugal
Portuguese explorers
Year of birth missing
Year of death missing